On 27 December 2022, flash floods hit the ancient city of Petra in Jordan. 1,700 tourists were evacuated from the historic site. This was reportedly a result of historic rainfall which hit the area.

Previous floods 
In 2018, 20 people were killed by floods, and in 1963, 23 French tourists were swept away by floodwater.

References 

2022 floods in Asia
Floods in Jordan
2022 in Jordan
December 2022 events in Asia
Petra